Paul A. McDonough (born 1941) is an American street photographer, living in New York City. His work is held in the collection of the Museum of Modern Art in New York and in 1981 he was awarded a Guggenheim Fellowship.

Publications

Books of work by McDonough
New York Photographs 1968–1978. New York: Umbrage, 2010. . With an essay by Susan Kismaric and a transcript of an interview with McDonough by Albert Mobilio.
Sight Seeing. New York: Sasha Wolf Gallery, 2014.
Headed West. West Midlands, UK: Stanley/Barker, 2021. .

Awards
1981: Guggenheim Fellowship from the John Simon Guggenheim Memorial Foundation

Collections
McDonough's work is held in the following permanent collection:
Museum of Modern Art, New York: 6 prints (as of July 2021)

References

External links
"Sweltering sidewalks: catching the heat in 1970s America – in pictures" at The Guardian

Street photographers
20th-century American photographers
People from Portsmouth, New Hampshire
Living people
1941 births